Neustadt-Glewe is an Amt in the Ludwigslust-Parchim district, in Mecklenburg-Vorpommern, Germany. The seat of the Amt is in Neustadt-Glewe.

The Amt Neustadt-Glewe consists of the following municipalities:
Blievenstorf
Brenz
Neustadt-Glewe

Ämter in Mecklenburg-Western Pomerania